Roland Poska (1938 – February 2, 2017) was an American artist who was notable for pioneering papermaking in modern art, for printmaking, and for frequently combining the two into completed works of art. He was also a teacher at the Layton School of Art in Milwaukee, Wisconsin, a co-founder of the Milwaukee Institute of Art & Design, and founder of the lithography studio the Fishy Whale Press.

Biography 
Poska was born to Lithuanian parents in Scotland in 1938. At age 10, he and his parents immigrated to the United States, and settled in Rockford, Illinois. After receiving degrees from Rockford College and Cranbrook Academy of Art, he became an instructor at Rockford College, then in 1963, moved to Milwaukee, where he taught at the Layton School of Art. When Layton closed, he co-founded the Milwaukee School of Art and Design and taught there.

In 1963, while attending Cranbrook, Poska was introduced to papermaking by Laurence Barker, the dean of the school's graphics department. In 1967, he purchased his first "beater", a machine that grinds rags and pulp in the initial step of producing handmade paper, and established his lithography studio the Fishy Whale Press. At the time, his lithography press was among the largest in the United States, using  blocks of stone. Under the Fishy Whale imprint, Poska and artist John Doyle produced The Great Human Race, a series of prints designed by Doyle that appear in the collections of a number of American museums. Poska continued to develop The Great Human Race as a perpetual art and philosophy project for over 30 years. He would go on to be recognized as a pioneer in the artistic medium of papermaking.

By 1984, Poska was a nationally known artist.

His works are included in the collections of the Art Institute of Chicago and The Metropolitan Museum of Art.

In his later years, Poska became an outspoken activist for equality and common human rights, and was a frequent speaker at Rockford town hall meetings. He died on February 2, 2017, in Rockford.

References 

1938 births
2017 deaths
20th-century American painters
21st-century American painters
21st-century American male artists
20th-century American printmakers
21st-century American printmakers
American male painters
Artists from Milwaukee
Artists from Illinois
Papermakers
American contemporary painters
American art educators
Cranbrook Academy of Art alumni
Rockford University alumni
American people of Lithuanian descent
20th-century American male artists